Rendu a 2006 Indian Tamil-language action thriller film directed by Sundar C and produced by Khushbu. The film stars Madhavan in dual lead roles, with Reema Sen and Anushka Shetty (in her Tamil film debut) as the lead actresses. Vadivelu, Santhanam and Bhagyaraj also appear in supporting roles alongside a large ensemble cast. Rendu, which featured music composed by D. Imman, released on 24 November 2006.

Plot
  
Shakti is a young man from a village with no job but much ambition and dreams. As he sees his life pass him by, stuck in a rut in his hometown, he decides that he will try his fortunes elsewhere. Chennai beckons him and off goes Shakti to join his uncle Kirikalan, who has a stall of magic tricks at an exhibition. Kirikalan is not really a magician, but poses as one, and his amateurish tricks don't exactly bring in big crowds.

Next door to Shakti and Kirikalam's stall though, is one ever-populated with visitors. The reason: it is an all-girls stand, with mermaid costumes as the theme. Velli is the 'head mermaid' at this stall run by her sister, and bitter quarrels between her and Shakti ensue, when he feels that she and her team are unfairly taking their customers away, and she has this impression of him being an unsavoury character. This misunderstanding is seen at different occasions where Velli and Shakti just happen to be in the wrong place at the wrong time — be it when Shakti gets off the bus from his village, asks for directions and is told to follow Velli, walking in the distance (Velli thinks he is a womaniser or when Shakti finally catches up with a miscreant who had picked his pocket and demands his money back — only Velli walks into the scene only at the demanding part. This whole collage of scenes is animated, with Kirikalan and Shakti trying to woo customers back to their stall, Shakti and Velli getting into arguments, and a general state of "fun" ruckus. Of course, love has been brewing as an undercurrent between the two young people.

The exhibition grounds owner keeps harassing Velli under some pretext or the other, like the rent not being paid on time. In fact, he has a soft spot for her, feelings thoroughly rejected by her. He finally abducts her, but Shakti rescues her. Similarly, Velli's plight is repeated when her "mora maapillai" (betrothed suitor) enters the scene and tries to force her to be with him, and Shakti steps in once again to save and protect Velli. The undercurrents of love blow up into a full-fledged torrent, and Velli and Shakti make up for all of their lost time professing their love for each other and romancing their way happily through the exhibition.

Meanwhile, we see a series of murders in different towns of the state and two perpetrators of these crimes slinking away from each. Not every time is it foolproof though, and at one crime scene, a witness spots the main culprit. He is instructed by the police to sketch and give them a pictorial description of the murderer, when it comes to the police's knowledge that both the criminals have been seen at Kumbakonam some time ago. Going through various fact files, the police come across the incident of a bad fire at a marriage hall in Kumbakonam, and as the officer in charge of the investigation flips through the picture files of the deceased, Kannan's face is shown, and the witness jumps. He tells the police he doesn't need to sketch anything when the face of the main murderer itself is staring them in the eye — he points to the photo of Kannan - it is the face of Shakti, only this one has light eyes. Investigations into the murder lead the police to Chennai. As luck would have it, Shakti is spotted, recognized, and arrested. Kannan, on the other hand, follows the murder investigation and is upset to find that an innocent man has been captured for crimes he has committed. He meets Kirikalan and Velli and plots to help Shakti get out. And so he does, and Shakti and he escape by the skin of their teeth. After much chase-and-hide, Kannan tells the story of what led him to murder all those people.

Kannan, his elder brother, and his father were renowned caterers and were commissioned to cook for a marriage function in Kumbakonam. The host was Kannan's father's friend and this gentleman's daughter Manjula  was going to be married in a joyous ceremony. There, Kannan meets Jyoti and falls in love instantly. At first he panics that Jyoti is the bride at the function but is vastly relieved when he finds out she is not. She really likes Kannan too and it all seems like Wonderland. Unfortunately, the groom's family creates trouble at the wedding and walks out, leaving the family distraught and desperate. Suddenly Kannan makes a suggestion, "Father, this is our friend's wedding and the bride is a wonderful girl. Why can't Anna (elder brother) marry her?" A brilliant idea and it is decided - only fate has to fell her axe right then, when all hell breaks loose and a raging fire attacks the marriage house. The father of the bride is a good man, and a dignitary in the town of Kumbakonam. He learns that some powerful thugs and gang leaders have sold a large piece of government property to a north Indian Landlord, completely illegally at exorbitant prices, with no gain for the townspeople themselves. He strongly opposes them and all their mischief comes to public notice and foils their plans. They want his blood as revenge.

They set fire to the building of the wedding and kill every single inmate inside — but two people escape, Kannan and his friend. Kannan, whose light eyes are a result of the fire (he walks with help and not very clear sight) is heartbroken and devastated at the loss of his entire family and lady love at what was to be a joyous, happy occasion. He vows retribution on the villains and sets about cold-bloodedly fulfilling this. Shakti decides to help Kannan achieve his revenge with the help of Velli and Kirikalan. At the end, however, Kannan sacrifices his own life to kill the final baddie, and he reunites with his family and lady love in heaven. Later that, Kannan jumps on Lava and he dies.

Cast

Madhavan as  Shakthi and Kannan (dual role)
Reemma Sen as Velli
Anushka Shetty as Jothi
Vadivelu as Kirikalan
K. Bhagyaraj as CBI Officer
Manivannan as Exhibition Grounds owner
Santhanam as Seenu
Nikita Palekar as Manjula
Bala Singh as Rathnasamy
Kumaresan as Innocent auto driver
Shyam Ganesh as Ganesh
Crane Manohar as Man who irritates Kirikalan at temple
Devadarshini as Devi, Kannan's sister
Tharika  as Velli's sister
Mayilswamy as Thief
Madhan Bob as Eyewitness
A. C. Murali Mohan as Devi's husband
Neelu as Kannan's grandfather
Bayilvan Ranganathan as magic show audience
V. M. Subburaj as magic show audience
Amarasigamani as Wedding guest
Raviprakash as Jothi's father
Thambi Ramaiah as Velli's father
Hariraj as Rakesh
Kritheeka
Bonda Mani as Kirikalan's assistant

Production
In mid-2006, Sundar C asked R. Madhavan to allot fifty days of his schedule to make a fun comedy entertainer film, to which the actor agreed. Madhavan shot for the film alongside his commitments in Mani Ratnam's Guru (2007) and lost eight kilogrammes for that particular role. Playing two roles in Rendu, he worked out to make one character appear more built than the other and often exercised in between schedule breaks to look thinner for the second role. Reemma Sen was signed on to appear in the project, while Anushka Shetty was signed on to make her first appearance in Tamil films. Hariraj, who had made his debut as a lead actor in Rajinikanth's Valli (1993), made a comeback as an antagonist through the project. The film began production in July 2006, with initial reports suggesting that the film would be shot on a cruise liner.

The film was predominantly shot in Chennai, with a small portion of the flashback shot in Karaikudi. A set resembling Courtallam was put up by art director Jana at Island Garden in Chennai, with twenty truckloads of water used for the scene.

Soundtrack
The soundtrack album was composed by D. Imman.

Release
Behindwoods.com gave the film a positive review stating "Sundar.C’s screenplay is riveting and keeps us guessing with unexpected twist" and "worth a mention is his handling of Maddy’s dual roles which is kept under wraps and hits us in our faces when disclosed". The critic added that the film "was pure time pass and worth a watch". Sify.com labelled the film as "corny but unpretentious and adequate time pass for an unfussy viewer", adding that "the charisma of Madhavan that makes the film watchable" and that "he looks good and proves his mettle for comedy and with Vadivelu the combo runs riot". In contrast, Rediff.com gave the film a negative review stating the venture was "too dumb to watch" and that "since most of the stars in the movie seemed to be adlibbing, one wonders what exactly was directed by Sundar C." The film performed well at the box office. Soon after the film's release, the team renamed the project as Irandu in order to gain tax exemptions as the government had considered Rendu to be colloquial.

References

External links
 

2006 films
2000s Tamil-language films
Films directed by Sundar C.
Indian action films
Indian films about revenge
Films shot in Chennai
Films shot in Karaikudi
Films scored by D. Imman
2006 action films